Asia Park was built for the 1986 Asian Games in Seoul, South Korea. The park is located near Seoul Sports Complex.

Transportation
Sports Complex Station on Seoul Subway Line 2.

References

External links
 Korean.visitkorea.or.kr
 Parks.seoul.go.kr

Parks in Seoul